Mirfield is a town and civil parish in Kirklees, West Yorkshire, England. Historically part of the West Riding of Yorkshire, it is on the A644 road between Brighouse and Dewsbury. At the 2011 census it had a population of 19,563. Mirfield forms part of the Heavy Woollen District.

Governance
From 1894 to 1974, Mirfield was an urban district in the West Riding of Yorkshire until it was merged into the Metropolitan Borough of Kirklees. In 1988 a parish council was formed, one of five in Kirklees, the others being:- Denby Dale, Meltham, Kirkburton and Holme Valley. As a parish council an additional tax precept to the Kirklees Metropolitan Borough Council tax is levied on the town's residents. It is made up of 16 councillors who serve for a fixed four-year term, and represent wards within the parish. The members elect a town mayor, who serves for a fixed one-year term.

Local elections
In addition to the town council Mirfield is represented by three councillors on Kirklees Metropolitan Council, and the local Mirfield Area Committee.

In May 2005, Mirfield became the first Fairtrade Town in Kirklees and only the fourth in West Yorkshire.

Culture
The Mirfield Show is an annual agricultural event held on the third Sunday in August at Mirfield showground. It is organised and run by the Mirfield Agricultural Society (MAS) as a non-profit making event for the families of Mirfield and district.

Local residents introduced the Mirfield Food & Craft Fayre in April 2012, scheduled to be run the last Saturday of each month and "help raise the profile of Mirfield, be a benefit to local traders, businesses, organisations and charities, and add more destination events to the Yorkshire calendar".

Education
There are two secondary schools in Mirfield: Mirfield Free Grammar and Sixth Form and Castle Hall School.

Primary schools include Battyeford CE Primary School, Crossley Fields, Old Bank, Hopton Primary School and Crowlees Junior and Infant School, all of which were assessed by Ofsted as 'Grade 1 – Outstanding' in the March 2007 inspection.

Landmarks

The 13th century St Mary's Church was rebuilt in 1826 but proved too small for the growing population and was regarded as too minor for the growing district. A new church, designed by Sir George Gilbert Scott, was built a few yards to the northwest, on the site of Castle Hall, a mansion then home to the families of Mirfields (sometimes spelled Mirfin), Hetons and Beaumonts. At Scott's suggestion, the tower of the earlier church, which retains some medieval work, was retained.

St. Mary's Church was also the boyhood church of Sir Patrick Stewart, of Star Trek fame.

The College of the Resurrection is a Church of England theological college. There, Rowan Williams, later the Archbishop of Canterbury, lectured from 1975 for two years and Archbishop Trevor Huddleston spent his last days.

Navigation
During the 18th century, a canal was constructed through the town linking the River Calder with other rivers in the area. The canal is part of the Calder and Hebble Navigation. Its construction resulted in many industries in Mirfield, such as the textiles and boat yards. The canal is still in use for recreational users with duck-feeding being especially popular.

Mirfield is the base of the Safe Anchor Trust, a charity founded in 1995 to provide canal boat trips for vulnerable and special needs people. In 2012, Princess Anne commissioned a new boat for the Trust.

The Brontës
Roe Head school, Mirfield, was a boarding school on the road from Leeds to Huddersfield where Charlotte Brontë went as a pupil on 17 January 1831, afterwards followed by her sisters Emily and Anne.  Charlotte was happy there and later returned to teach. 

In April 1839 Anne returned to the town as governess to four children of the Ingham family of Blake Hall. Her unhappy experiences there were used in her first novel Agnes Grey.

Notable people
Lee Blakeley, theatre director
Alun Cochrane, comedian
Andi Durrant, radio presenter and music producer
Debbie Lindley, TV weather presenter
Richard Reed, co-founder of Innocent Drinks
Brian Robinson, cyclist, the first Briton to win a stage of the Tour de France
Mary Snell-Hornby, translation scholar
Sir Patrick Stewart, actor
Hilda Annetta Walker, artist
David Whyte, poet, philosopher

Economy
There are many national businesses based in Mirfield including John Cotton Group Ltd,  Furniture And Choice and We Buy Any Stairlift. 

The town has a variety of local independent shops as well as national chains such as Lidl, Tesco and Co-op Food.

Sport

Mirfield is represented in Rugby League by Mirfield ARLFC, who play home matches at Frank Middleton Park and compete in the Pennine League Premier Division.

The town also has three teams in the Huddersfield Cricket League. Mirfield Cricket Club and Moorlands Cricket Club both based at the Memorial Park off Huddersfield Road. Mirfield Parish Cavaliers based on Wellhouse Lane, Northorpe.

The Mirfield Petanque Club who currently play in the West Yorkshire Petanque League and are also based at the Memorial Park.

Location

Twin town
 Kramolna, Czech Republic

Arms

See also
Listed buildings in Mirfield
Mirfield Reporter

References

External links

 Mirfield Town Council homepage
 Mirfield in Pictures
 Mirfield to Low Moor railway line
 Kirklees Council Website, Mirfield Information page

Towns in West Yorkshire
Heavy Woollen District
Geography of Kirklees
Civil parishes in West Yorkshire